This is a list of foreign ministers in 2002.

Africa
 Algeria - Abdelaziz Belkhadem (2000-2005)
 Angola - João Bernardo de Miranda (1999-2008)
 Benin - Antoine Idji Kolawolé (1998-2003)
 Botswana - Mompati Merafhe (1994-2008)
 Burkina Faso - Youssouf Ouedraogo (1999-2007)
 Burundi - Terence Sinunguruza (2001-2005)
 Cameroon - François Xavier Ngoubeyou (2001-2004)
 Cape Verde -
 Manuel Inocêncio Sousa (2001-2002)
 Fátima Veiga (2002-2004)
 Central African Republic - Agba Otikpo Mézodé (2001-2003)
 Chad - Mahamat Saleh Annadif (1997-2003)
 Comoros -
 Mohamed El-Amine Souef (1999-2002)
 Halidi Charif (2002)
 Mohamed El-Amine Souef (2002-2005)
 Republic of Congo - Rodolphe Adada (1997-2007)
 Democratic Republic of Congo -  Léonard She Okitundu (2000-2003)
 Côte d'Ivoire -  Abou Drahamane Sangare (2000-2003)
 Djibouti - Ali Abdi Farah (1999-2005)
 Egypt - Ahmed Maher (2001-2004)
 Equatorial Guinea - Santiago Nsobeya Efuman (1999-2003)
 Eritrea - Ali Said Abdella (2000-2005)
 Ethiopia - Seyoum Mesfin (1991-2010)
 Gabon - Jean Ping (1999-2008)
 The Gambia - Baboucarr-Blaise Jagne (2001-2004)
 Ghana -  Hackman Owusu-Agyeman (2001-2003)
 Guinea -
 Mahawa Bangoura (2000-2002)
 François Lonseny Fall (2002-2004)
 Guinea-Bissau -
 Filomena Mascarenhas Tipote (2001-2002)
 Joãozinho Vieira Có (2002-2003)
 Kenya - Marsden Madoka (2001-2003)
 Lesotho -
 Tom Thabane (1998-2002)
 Mohlabi Tsekoa (2002-2004)
 Liberia - Monie Captan (1996-2003)
 Libya - Abdel Rahman Shalgham (2000-2009)
 Madagascar -
 Lila Ratsifandrihamanana (1998-2002)
 Azaly Ben Marofo (2002)
 Marcel Ranjeva (2002-2009)
 Malawi - Lilian Patel (2000-2004)
 Mali -
 Modibo Sidibe (1997-2002)
 Lassana Traoré (2002-2004)
 Mauritania -
 Dah Ould Abdi (2001-2002)
 Mohamed Ould Tolba (2002-2003)
 Mauritius - Anil Gayan (2000-2003)
 Morocco - Mohamed Benaissa (1999-2007)
 Western Sahara - Mohamed Salem Ould Salek (1998–2023)
 Mozambique - Leonardo Simão (1994-2005)
 Namibia -
 Theo-Ben Gurirab (1990-2002)
 Hidipo Hamutenya (2002-2004)
 Niger - Aïchatou Mindaoudou (2001-2010)
 Nigeria - Sule Lamido (2000-2003)
 Rwanda -
 André Bumaya (2000-2002)
 Charles Murigande (2002-2008)
 São Tomé and Príncipe -
 Patrice Trovoada (2001-2002)
 Mateus Meira Rita (2002)
 Alda Bandeira (2002)
 Mateus Meira Rita (2002-2004)
 Senegal - Cheikh Tidiane Gadio (2000-2009)
 Seychelles - Jérémie Bonnelame (1997-2005)
 Sierra Leone -
 Ahmed Ramadan Dumbuya (2001-2002)
 Momodu Koroma (2002-2007)
 Somalia -
 Ismail Mahmud Hurre (2000-2002)
 Yusuf Hassan Ibrahim (2002-2004)
 Somaliland -
 Abdihamid Garad Jama (2001-2002)
 Mohamed Said Gees (2002-2003)
 South Africa - Nkosazana Dlamini-Zuma (1999-2009)
 Sudan - Mustafa Osman Ismail (1998-2005)
 Swaziland - Abednego Ntshangase (2001-2003)
 Tanzania - Jakaya Kikwete (1995-2006)
 Togo -
 Joseph Kokou Koffigoh (2000-2002)
 Roland Kpotsra (2002-2003)
 Tunisia - Habib Ben Yahia (1999-2004)
 Uganda - James Wapakhabulo (2001-2004)
 Zambia -
 Keli Walubita (1997-2002)
 Katele Kalumba (2002)
 Kalombo Mwansa (2002-2005)
 Zimbabwe - Stan Mudenge (1995-2005)

Asia
 Afghanistan - Abdullah Abdullah (2001-2006)
 Armenia - Vartan Oskanian (1998-2008)
 Azerbaijan - Vilayat Guliyev (1999-2004)
 Nagorno-Karabakh -
 Naira Melkumyan (1997-2002)
 Ashot Gulyan (2002-2004)
 Bahrain - Sheikh Muhammad ibn Mubarak ibn Hamad Al Khalifah (1971-2005)
 Bangladesh - Morshed Khan (2001-2006)
 Bhutan - Jigme Thinley (1998-2003)
 Brunei - Pengiran Muda Mohamed Bolkiah (1984–2015)
 Cambodia - Hor Namhong (1998–2016)
 China - Tang Jiaxuan (1998-2003)
 East Timor - José Ramos-Horta (2000-2006)
 Georgia - Irakli Menagarishvili (1995-2003)
 Abkhazia - Sergei Shamba (1997-2004)
 South Ossetia - Murat Dzhioyev (1998-2012)
 India -
 Jaswant Singh (1998-2002)
 Yashwant Sinha (2002-2004)
 Indonesia - Hassan Wirajuda (2001-2009)
 Iran - Kamal Kharazi (1997-2005)
 Iraq - Naji Sabri (2001-2003)
 Israel -
 Shimon Peres (2001-2002)
 Ariel Sharon (2002)
 Benjamin Netanyahu (2002-2003)
 Japan -
 Makiko Tanaka (2001-2002)
 Junichiro Koizumi (2002)
 Yoriko Kawaguchi (2002-2004)
 Jordan -
 Abdul Ilah Khatib (1998-2002)
 Marwan al-Muasher (2002-2004)
 Kazakhstan -
 Erlan Idrisov (1999-2002)
 Kassym-Jomart Tokayev (2002-2007)
 North Korea - Paek Nam-sun (1998-2007)
 South Korea -
 Han Seung-soo (2001-2002)
 Choi Sung Hong (2002-2003)
 Kuwait - Sheikh Sabah Al-Ahmad Al-Jaber Al-Sabah (1978-2003)
 Kyrgyzstan -
 Muratbek Imanaliyev (1997-2002)
 Askar Aitmatov (2002)
 Laos - Somsavat Lengsavad (1993-2006)
 Lebanon - Mahmoud Hammoud (2000-2003)
 Malaysia - Syed Hamid Albar (1999-2008)
 Maldives - Fathulla Jameel (1978-2005)
 Mongolia - Luvsangiin Erdenechuluun (2000-2004)
 Myanmar - Win Aung (1998-2004)
 Nepal -
 Sher Bahadur Deuba (2001-2002)
 Narendra Bikram Shah (2002-2003)
 Oman - Yusuf bin Alawi bin Abdullah (1982–2020)
 Pakistan -
 Abdul Sattar (1999-2002)
 Inam ul-Haq (2002)
 Khurshid Mahmud Kasuri (2002-2007)
 Philippines -
 Teofisto Guingona, Jr. (2001-2002)
 Gloria Macapagal Arroyo (2002)
 Blas Ople (2002-2003)
 Qatar - Sheikh Hamad bin Jassim bin Jaber Al Thani (1992-2013)
 Saudi Arabia - Prince Saud bin Faisal bin Abdulaziz Al Saud (1975–2015)
 Singapore - S. Jayakumar (1994-2004)
 Sri Lanka - Tyronne Fernando (2001-2004)
 Syria - Farouk al-Sharaa (1984-2006)
 Taiwan -
 Tien Hung-mao (2000-2002)
 Eugene Chien (2002-2004)
 Tajikistan - Talbak Nazarov (1994-2006)
 Thailand - Surakiart Sathirathai (2001-2005)
 Turkey -
 İsmail Cem (1997-2002)
 Şükrü Sina Gürel (2002)
 Yaşar Yakış (2002-2003)
 Turkmenistan - Raşit Meredow (2001–present)
 United Arab Emirates - Rashid Abdullah Al Nuaimi (1980-2006)
 Uzbekistan - Abdulaziz Komilov (1994-2003)
 Vietnam - Nguyễn Dy Niên (2000-2006)
 Yemen - Abu Bakr al-Qirbi (2001-2014)

Australia and Oceania
 Australia - Alexander Downer (1996-2007)
 Fiji - Kaliopate Tavola (2000-2006)
 French Polynesia - Gaston Flosse (2000-2004)
 Kiribati -  Teburoro Tito (1994-2003)
 Marshall Islands - Gerald Zackios (2001-2008)
 Micronesia -  Ieske Iehsi (2001-2003)
 Nauru - René Harris (2001-2003)
 New Zealand - Phil Goff (1999-2005)
 Cook Islands - Robert Woonton (1999-2004)
 Niue -
 Sani Lakatani (1999-2002)
 Young Vivian (2002-2008)
 Palau - Temmy Shmull (2001-2009)
 Papua New Guinea -
 John Waiko (2001-2002)
 Sir Rabbie Namaliu (2002-2006)
 Samoa - Tuilaepa Sailele Malielegaoi (1998–2021)
 Solomon Islands -
 Alex Bartlett (2001-2002)
 Nollen Leni (2002)
 Laurie Chan (2002-2006)
 Tonga - Prince 'Ulukalala Lavaka Ata (1998-2004)
 Tuvalu -
 Koloa Talake (2001-2002)
 Saufatu Sopoanga (2002-2004)
 Vanuatu -
 Alain Mahe (2001-2002)
 Serge Vohor (2002-2003)

Europe
 Albania - Ilir Meta (2001–2003)
 Andorra - Juli Minoves Triquell (2001–2007)
 Austria - Benita Ferrero-Waldner (2000–2004)
 Belarus - Mikhail Khvostov (2000–2003)
 Belgium - Louis Michel (1999–2004)
 Brussels-Capital Region - Guy Vanhengel (2000–2009)
 Flanders -
 Paul Van Grembergen (2001–2002)
 Jaak Gabriëls (2002–2003)
 Bosnia and Herzegovina - Zlatko Lagumdžija (2001–2003)
 Bulgaria - Solomon Passy (2001–2005)
 Croatia - Tonino Picula (2000–2003)
 Cyprus - Ioannis Kasoulidis (1997–2003)
 Northern Cyprus - Tahsin Ertuğruloğlu (1998–2004)
 Czech Republic -
 Jan Kavan (1998–2002)
 Cyril Svoboda (2002–2006)
 Denmark - Per Stig Møller (2001–2010)
 Estonia -
 Toomas Hendrik Ilves (1999–2002)
 Kristiina Ojuland (2002–2005)
 Finland - Erkki Tuomioja (2000–2007)
 France -
 Hubert Védrine (1997–2002)
 Dominique de Villepin (2002–2004)
 Germany - Joschka Fischer (1998–2005)
 Greece - George Papandreou (1999–2004)
 Hungary -
 János Martonyi (1998–2002)
 László Kovács (2002–2004)
 Iceland - Halldór Ásgrímsson (1995–2004)
 Ireland - Brian Cowen (2000–2004)
 Italy -
 Renato Ruggiero (2001–2002)
 Silvio Berlusconi (interim) (2002)
 Franco Frattini (2002–2004)
 Latvia -
 Indulis Bērziņš (1999–2002)
 Sandra Kalniete (2002–2004)
 Liechtenstein - Ernst Walch (2001–2005)
 Lithuania - Antanas Valionis (2000–2006)
 Luxembourg - Lydie Polfer (1999–2004)
 Macedonia -
 Slobodan Čašule (2001–2002)
 Ilinka Mitreva (2002–2006)
 Malta -  Joe Borg (1999–2004)
 Moldova - Nicolae Dudău (2001–2004)
 Transnistria - Valeriy Litskai (2000–2008)
 Netherlands -
 Jozias van Aartsen (1998–2002)
 Jaap de Hoop Scheffer (2002–2003)
 Norway - Jan Petersen (2001–2005)
 Poland - Włodzimierz Cimoszewicz (2001–2005)
 Portugal -
 Jaime Gama (1995–2002)
 António Martins da Cruz (2002–2003)
 Romania - Mircea Geoană (2000–2004)
 Russia - Igor Ivanov (1998–2004)
 San Marino -
 Gabriele Gatti (1986–2002)
 Augusto Casali (2002)
 Fiorenzo Stolfi (2002–2003)
 Slovakia - Eduard Kukan (1998–2006)
 Slovenia - Dimitrij Rupel (2000–2004)
 Spain -
 Josep Piqué (2000–2002)
 Ana de Palacio y del Valle-Lersundi (2002–2004)
 Sweden - Anna Lindh (1998–2003)
 Switzerland - Joseph Deiss (1999–2002)
 Ukraine - Anatoliy Zlenko (2000–2003)
 United Kingdom - Jack Straw (2001–2006)
 Vatican City - Archbishop Jean-Louis Tauran (1990–2003)
 Yugoslavia - Goran Svilanović (2000–2004)
 Montenegro -
 Branko Lukovac (2000–2002)
 Dragan Đurović (acting) (2002–2003)

North America and the Caribbean
 Antigua and Barbuda - Lester Bird (1991-2004)
 The Bahamas -
 Janet Bostwick (1994-2002)
 Fred Mitchell (2002-2007)
 Barbados - Billie Miller (1994-2008)
 Belize -
 Said Musa (1998-2002)
 Assad Shoman (2002-2003)
 Canada -
 John Manley (2000-2002)
 Bill Graham (2002-2004)
 Quebec - Louise Beaudoin (1998-2003)
 Costa Rica -
 Roberto Rojas López (1998-2002)
 Roberto Tovar Faja (2002-2006)
 Cuba - Felipe Pérez Roque (1999-2009)
 Dominica - Osborne Riviere (2001-2005)
 Dominican Republic - Hugo Tolentino Dipp (2000-2003)
 El Salvador - María Eugenia Brizuela de Ávila (1999-2004)
 Grenada - Elvin Nimrod (2000-2008)
 Guatemala -
 Gabriel Orellana Rojas (2000-2002)
 Edgar Armando Gutiérrez Girón (2002-2004)
 Haiti - Joseph Philippe Antonio (2001-2004)
 Honduras -
 Roberto Flores Bermúdez (1999-2002)
 Guillermo Pérez Arias (2002-2003)
 Jamaica - Keith Desmond Knight (2001-2006)
 Mexico - Jorge Castañeda Gutman (2000-2003)
 Nicaragua -
 Francisco Aguirre Sacasa (2000-2002)
 Norman José Caldera Cardenal (2002-2007)
 Panama - José Miguel Alemán Healy (1999-2003)
 Puerto Rico – Ferdinand Mercado (2001–2003)
 Saint Kitts and Nevis - Timothy Harris (2001-2008)
 Saint Lucia - Julian Hunte (2001-2005)
 Saint Vincent and the Grenadines - Louis Straker (2001-2005)
 Trinidad and Tobago - Knowlson Gift (2001-2006)
 United States - Colin Powell (2001-2005)

South America
 Argentina -
 José María Vernet (2001-2002)
 Carlos Ruckauf (2002-2003)
 Bolivia -
 Gustavo Fernández Saavedra (2001-2002)
 Carlos Saavedra Bruno (2002-2003)
 Brazil - Celso Lafer (2001-2003)
 Chile - Soledad Alvear (2000-2004)
 Colombia -
 Guillermo Fernández de Soto (1998-2002)
 Carolina Barco (2002-2006)
 Ecuador - Heinz Moeller Freile (2000-2003)
 Guyana - Rudy Insanally (2001-2008)
 Paraguay - José Antonio Moreno Ruffinelli (2001-2003)
 Peru -
 Diego García Sayán (2001-2002)
 Allan Wagner Tizón (2002-2003)
 Suriname - Marie Levens (2000-2005)
 Uruguay - Didier Opertti (1998-2005)
 Venezuela -
 Luis Alfonso Dávila (2001-2002)
 José Rodríguez Iturbe (2002)
 Luis Alfonso Dávila (2002)
 Roy Chaderton (2002-2004)

2002 in international relations
Foreign ministers
2002